Celosia whitei, is a species of flowering plant in the amaranth family, Amaranthaceae. It was described in 1961 by William F. Grant, as Celosia whiteii. The plant was named in honor of Orland E. White.

References

whitei
Plants described in 1961